The PEN Translation Prize (formerly known as the PEN/Book-of-the-Month Club Translation Prize through 2008) is an annual award given by PEN America (formerly PEN American Center) to outstanding translations into the English language. It has been presented annually by PEN America and the Book of the Month Club since 1963. It was the first award in the United States expressly for literary translators. A 1999 New York Times article called it "the Academy Award of Translation" and that the award is thus usually not given to younger translators.

The distinction comes with a cash prize of USD $3,000. Any book-length English translation published in the United States during the year in question is eligible, irrespective of the residence or nationality of either the translator or the original author.

The award is separate from the similar PEN Award for Poetry in Translation.

The PEN Translation Prize was called one of "the most prominent translation awards." The award is one of many PEN awards sponsored by International PEN affiliates in over 145 PEN centres around the world. The PEN American Center awards have been characterized as being among the "major" American literary prizes.

Winners

See also
 PEN/Heim Translation Fund Grants

References

External links
PEN Translation Prize

Translation awards
PEN America awards
Awards established in 1963
1963 establishments in the United States